The Polish Marathon (Polish:Maraton polski) is a 1927 Polish silent drama film directed by Wiktor Biegański and starring Mieczysław Cybulski, Wanda Smosarska and Jerzy Kobusz.

Cast
 Mieczysław Cybulski as Janek 
 Wanda Smosarska as Narzeczona Janka 
 Jerzy Kobusz as Filipek

References

Bibliography
Skaff, Sheila. The Law of the Looking Glass: Cinema in Poland, 1896–1939. Ohio University Press, 2008.

External links

1927 films
1927 drama films
Polish drama films
Polish silent films
1920s Polish-language films
Films directed by Wiktor Bieganski
Films set in Poland
Polish black-and-white films
Silent drama films